Koslowski is a surname. It is a variant of Kozłowski. Notable people with the surname include:

 Álvaro Koslowski (born 1971), Brazilian sprint canoer
 George Bernard "Dave" Koslowski (1920-1975), professional baseball player
 Peter Koslowski (1952-2012), professor of philosophy
 Willi Koslowski (born 1937), German football player

See also
 Kozłowski, a surname
 Kozlovsky, a surname

Polish-language surnames